Reneé Tenison (born December 2, 1968) is an American model, actress, and the first African-American selected to be the Playboy Playmate of the Year (1990).

Personal life and career 

Tenison was born in Caldwell, Idaho. She has three older brothers and an identical twin sister, Rosie, who also works as a model. Rosie and Renee posed in the August 2002 issue of Playboy together.

Tenison appeared as the Playmate of the Month in the November 1989 issue of Playboy magazine and was subsequently named Playmate of the Year for 1990, the first PMOY of African American descent. In 2001, she was selected as one of the ten sexiest women of the year by the readers of Black Men magazine.
In 2017 at the age of 49 Tenison duplicated her Playmate of the Year cover along with her cohorts Kimberley Conrad, Candace Collins, Lisa Matthews, Cathy St. George, Charlotte Kemp, and Monique St. Pierre nearly three decades on.

Filmography

Films

Television

See also
 List of people in Playboy 1980–1989
 List of people in Playboy 1990–1999

References

External links
 Renee Tenison at Playboy Online
 

1968 births
Living people
People from Caldwell, Idaho
African-American actresses
Identical twin actresses
1980s Playboy Playmates
Playboy Playmates of the Year
African-American Playboy Playmates
African-American female models
American television actresses
Actresses from Idaho
American twins
21st-century African-American people
21st-century African-American women
20th-century African-American people
20th-century African-American women